Bogdan Gheorghe Rusu (born 9 April 1990) is a Romanian professional footballer who plays as a striker for CS Mioveni.

Career statistics

Club

Honours
Hermannstadt
Cupa României runner-up: 2017–18

References

External links
 
 

1990 births
Living people
Sportspeople from Brașov
Romanian footballers
Association football forwards
Liga I players
Liga II players
Liga III players
FC Astra Giurgiu players
CS Aerostar Bacău players
FCV Farul Constanța players
AFC Dacia Unirea Brăila players
FC Brașov (1936) players
ACS Foresta Suceava players
FC Hermannstadt players
FC Petrolul Ploiești players
FC Dunărea Călărași players
CS Mioveni players
FC Steaua București players